The Côte d'Azur Observatory (OCA) is a network of astronomical observatories throughout southern France. It originated in 1988 with the merger of two observatories:
 Nice Observatory
 Centre de recherches en géodynamique et astrométrie (CERGA)

Cote d'Azure Observatory tested beam combining technology at CHARA array.

Astronomers developed a theory about M-Type asteroids, that may be tested by the planned spacecraft Psyche.

See also 
 List of astronomical observatories
 Lunar Laser Ranging Experiment
 OCA-DLR Asteroid Survey

References

External links 
 Côte d'Azur Observatory official website (English version)
Grand Interferometre a 2 Telescopes (GI2T REGAIN )

Astronomical observatories in France